Lee Jae-hwan  ( born April 6, 1992),  better known by his stage name Ken, is a South Korean singer and actor, signed under Jellyfish Entertainment. He is one of the members in the South Korean boy group VIXX, and has been widely praised for his unique, soulful, and husky vocal tone. Ken began his acting career in 2014 in MBC Every 1's comedy drama Boarding House No. 24 as Lee Jae-hwan.

Early life
Born April 6, 1992 in Jayang-dong, Seoul, South Korea. Ken's family consists of his parents, himself and two older brothers. He studied at Baekseok Arts University majoring in Practical Music. At a young age, he entered and won many singing competitions at local festivals. He later performed and won more singing competitions in middle school as part of a team with his friends prior to debuting with VIXX.

Career

2012–2013: Debut with VIXX and OSTs

Despite lacking experience in dance, Ken was able to pass his audition to Jellyfish Entertainment because of his singing where he trained for five months before debuting with VIXX. During this time Ken was one of ten trainees who were contestants in Mnet's survival reality show MyDOL and was chosen to be a part of the final line-up and the 6-member boy group VIXX finally debuted with "Super Hero" on May 24, 2012 on M! Countdown.

In 2013, Ken contributed to The Heirs OST with "In the Name of Love". He was also featured with J'Kyun on the song "Ponytail".

In 2013, Ken made a cameo appearance in episode four of SBS' television drama The Heirs alongside his group members.

2014–2015: Acting debut, Gap and musical theatre debut 
In 2014, Ken contributed to another soundtrack for the You Are My Destiny OST with the song "My Girl".

In 2014, the singer landed his first acting role as a main cast member in the television comedy drama MBC Every 1's Boarding House No. 24 as Lee Jae-hwan.

On June 24, 2015, Ken and Hani released a duet called "Gap".

In 2015, Ken was cast in the musical Chess in the lead role of Anatoly Sergievsky, a world champion chess player from June 19, 2015 to July 19, 2015 at the Sejong Grand Theater in Seoul. For the role, he had to sing at a lower register, a sharp contrast from the high notes that predominantly appear in VIXX's music. His powerful vocals were showcased in the music video for one of the songs, "Anthem". He also appeared in Chinese singer Lu Yu's music video "The Fourth Dimension Love" as a former boyfriend. A big fan of VIXX, the singer had personally offered the role to Ken who accepted.

In 2015 Ken landed his second musical role in the first Korean production of the musical Cinderella in the lead role of Prince Christopher from September 12, 2015 to January 3, 2016 at the Chungmu Art Hall, Grand Theater in Seoul and Seongnam Arts Center Opera House.

2016–present: Solo activities
In February 2016, Ken contributed to the Moorim School OST with the song "When I See You". On May 24, it was announced that Ken would be collaborating with Mystic Entertainment's Yoon Jong-shin on his monthly collaboration project, Melody Monthly. The project which has included artists like Seventeen's vocal unit and Epik High's Tablo, the single "Over Sleep" was released on May 30, 2016. On December 22, 2016, Ken contributed to The Legend of the Blue Sea soundtrack with the song "Fool".

From April to May 2016, he was invited to Duet Song Festival to showcase his vocal abilities with his partner Choi Sang-yeob. They were wanted by the audience so many times for almost winning episodes which allowed him to appear in more than one episode. They finally won on episode six with That's Only My World (그것만이 내 세상). Finally, returned in August 2016 for the "King of Kings" special for episode 16 and 17.

In 2017, Ken was cast in three musicals: Tsukasa Domyouji in Boys Over Flowers the Musical, Hamlet in Hamlet, and as Frederick Barrett in the Titanic the Musical.

In 2018, Ken played in the musical Iron Mask as Louis and his twin Philip.

On December 25, 2018, it was announced that Ken joined the cast of an upcoming musical Jack the Ripper as Daniel.

On April 15, 2019, it was confirmed that Ken also joining a new musical "Mefisto" in a lead role scheduled to run from May 25 to July 28.

On May 20, 2020, Ken made his solo debut with his first EP "Greeting", with its lead single "Just For A Moment".

On July 6, 2020, Ken enlisted in the South Korean military, where he joined the military band.  He was discharged on January 5, 2022.

Discography

Extended plays

Singles

Notes

Filmography

Television series

Web series

Television shows

Musicals

Awards and nominations

References

External links

Jellyfish Entertainment artists
VIXX members
Japanese-language singers of South Korea
South Korean dance music singers
South Korean male idols
South Korean pop singers
South Korean male singers
South Korean male musical theatre actors
South Korean male television actors
People from Seoul
Musicians from Seoul
Male actors from Seoul
1992 births
Living people
Baekseok Arts University alumni
21st-century South Korean singers
Singers from Seoul